Sleeping Dogs is a late night programme aired on BBC Choice Wales that ran for two series from 2000 until 2001. The show consisted of an entertaining yet peculiar mix of short, quirky factual films featuring people from all walks of life from around Wales coupled with darkly surreal comic shorts.

Trivia
It was presented by actress Jenny Evans, who had also played Bonny Cartwright in 1997 film Twin Town.
Author David Llewellyn wrote and acted in the sketch The Technostics Church of Great Britain for the series.
Sean Carlsen is a regular in Big Finish Productions' Doctor Who audio adventures and played a policeman in the 2005 Doctor Who Christmas special The Christmas Invasion. He was also butchered by an alien in Torchwood episode "Sleepers".

Staff

Simon Adams
Sara Allen
Colin Bowen
Stephen Bush
Sean Carlsen
Jon Chapple – Shooting at Unarmed Men/Mclusky
Sally Collins
Jenny Evans
Rob Finighan
Steve Floyd
Matt Hurley
Steve Jenkins
Tom Law
Kyle Legal
David Llewellyn
Eleanor McRea
Paul Owen
Janice Pugsley
Alun Roberts
Pete Telfer
Jan Wierszylowski
Ronnie Williams
Tim Williamson

References/Links
 http://aspect-tv.com/programmes.htm
 http://www.spock.com/Pete-Telfer-Rdgqx15
 http://www.madjanice.com/
 https://actors.mandy.com/uk/actor/profile/stephen-bush
 http://www.theatre-wales.co.uk/performers/performers_details.asp?individualID=441
 https://actors.mandy.com/uk

BBC television comedy
2000 British television series debuts
2001 British television series endings